Out of the Tradition is an album by trumpeter Jack Walrath which was recorded in 1990 and released on the Muse label in 1992.

Track listing
 "Clear Out of This World" (Jimmy McHugh, Al Dubin) – 9:22
 "So Long Eric" (Charles Mingus) – 7:11
 "Stardust" (Hoagy Carmichael, Mitchell Parish) –6:46
 "Wake Up and Wash It Off!" (Jack Walrath) – 7:12	
 "Come Sunday" (Duke Ellington) – 7:11
 "Brother, Can You Spare a Dime?" (Jay Gorney, Yip Harburg) – 7:43	
 "Cabin in the Sky" (Vernon Duke, John La Touche) – 7:24
 "I'm Getting Sentimental Over You" (George Bassman, Ned Washington) – 5:57

Personnel
Jack Walrath – trumpet 
Larry Coryell – guitar
Benny Green – piano
Anthony Cox – bass 
Ronnie Burrage – drums

References

Muse Records albums
Jack Walrath albums
1992 albums
Albums recorded at Van Gelder Studio